Colonel Fulke Southwell Greville-Nugent, 1st Baron Greville (17 February 1821 – 25 January 1883), known as Fulke Greville until 1866, was an Irish Liberal politician.

Early life
Greville was the second son of Algernon Greville, Esq., of North Lodge in Hertford, and the former Caroline Graham. His mother was the second daughter of Sir Bellingham Graham, 6th Baronet.

He was a member of a junior branch of the Greville family headed by the Earl of Warwick.

Political career
Greville sat as Member of Parliament for Longford County as a Liberal from 19 July 1852 until 1869, when he was raised to the Peerage of the United Kingdom as Baron Greville, of Clonyn in the County of Westmeath. He had adopted the surname of Nugent-Greville by Royal Patent in 1866. He subsequently served as Lord Lieutenant of Westmeath from 1871 to 1883.

Personal life
On 28 April 1840 Lord Greville married Lady Rosa Emily Mary Anne Nugent, the only daughter and heir of George Nugent, 1st Marquess of Westmeath and, his first wife, Lady Emily Cecil (second daughter of James Cecil, 1st Marquess of Salisbury). Together, they had six children:

 Algernon Greville-Nugent, 2nd Baron Greville (1841–1909).
 Hon. George Frederick Greville-Nugent (1842–1897).
 Hon. Robert Southwell Greville-Nugent (1847–1912).
 Hon. Reginald James Macartney Greville-Nugent (1848–1878).
 Hon. Patrick Emilius John Greville-Nugent (1852–1925), who married Ermengarda Ogilvy on 5 June 1882.
 Hon. Mildred Charlotte Greville-Nugent (d. 1906), who married Alexius Huchet, Marquis de La Bêdoyére on 26 August 1869.

Lord Greville died on 25 January 1883.

References

External links

Greville, Fulke Greville-Nugent, 1st Baron
Greville, Fulke Greville-Nugent, 1st Baron
Greville, Fulke Greville-Nugent, 1st Baron
High Sheriffs of Hertfordshire
Irish Liberal Party MPs
Greville, Fulke Greville-Nugent, 1st Baron
Members of the Parliament of the United Kingdom for County Longford constituencies (1801–1922)
UK MPs 1852–1857
UK MPs 1859–1865
UK MPs 1865–1868
UK MPs 1868–1874
UK MPs who were granted peerages
Fulke
British Army officers
Peers of the United Kingdom created by Queen Victoria